The Presbyterian Church in Korea (Ko-Ryu-Anti-Accusation) is a conservative Presbyterian denomination in South Korea. It split from the Presbyterian Church in Korea (Koshin). Koshin General assembly was divided into Anti-accusation and accusation groups. The General assembly decided to bring song Sang-Suk to court the anti accusation group separated in 1976. Later KoRyu divided and a significant part reunited with Koshin. In 2004 it had almost 200 congregations and 66,345 members and 391 ordained ministers. The church subscribes the Apostles Creed and Westminster Confession.

References 

Presbyterian denominations in South Korea
Presbyterian denominations in Asia